Avraham S. Rinat-Reiner (born 3 June 1929) is a Dutch-Israeli theoretical physicist who worked as professor at the Weizmann Institute of Science.

Rinat was born in Amsterdam. During his childhood he was friends with Anne Frank. During World War II Rinat went into hiding on a farm in Hollandscheveld. He ended up in Westerbork transit camp where he remained until the liberation of the camp. In 1958 he obtained his PhD at the University of Amsterdam under professor J. de Boer with a thesis titled: "Structure effects in the interaction between nuclei and atomic electrons".

Rinat was elected a corresponding member of the Royal Netherlands Academy of Arts and Sciences in 1981.

References

1929 births
Living people
20th-century Dutch physicists
Israeli physicists
Members of the Royal Netherlands Academy of Arts and Sciences
Scientists from Amsterdam
University of Amsterdam alumni
Academic staff of Weizmann Institute of Science